Muammer Güler (born 21 March 1949) is a Turkish politician. He is a member of parliament from the Justice and Development Party (AKP). He was formerly the Governor of Istanbul Province and the Minister of the Interior under Prime Minister Recep Tayyip Erdoğan's government.

Biography
Güler was born in Mardin, Turkey. He completed his primary education in Ankara and graduated from the Faculty of Law at the University of Ankara in 1972. Güler began his career as candidate District Governor on 14 March 1973 in Balıkesir. After taking post as Deputy District Governor of Çal in Denizli Province and then District Governor of Pehlivanköy in  Kırklareli Province and Horasan in Erzurum Province, he was assigned to the Directorate of Personnel Branch at the Ministry of Interior, where he served as Branch Director and later as Director General.

On 16 September 1993 he was appointed governor of Niğde Province. From 29 January 1992 on he was the governor of Kayseri Province. After serving as governor of Gaziantep Province between 6 July 1994 and 28 July 2000, Güler moved to Samsun Province as governor. Starting 17 February 2003 he served as the Governor of Istanbul Province. On 12 May 2010 Güler began the position of MOI Undersecretary for Security and Public Order. On 24 January 2013, he was appointed minister of interior, replacing İdris Naim Şahin in the post.

He is married to Neval Güler, a retired math teacher, since 1977. They have a son, Barış Güler, and a daughter.

Some of his critics have dubbed him "Chemical Muammer", comparing him with "Chemical Ali". Among his other nicknames are "Neckless Muammer", "Neckless Muammer Pasha", and "Neckless Muammer Pasha, Governor of Dersaadet".

2013 corruption scandal

On 17 December 2013, his son Barış Güler was arrested as a consequence of a corruption operation. Muammer Güler resigned as Minister of the Interior amid the scandal on 25 December together with Minister of Economy Zafer Çağlayan and Minister of Environment and Urban Planning Erdoğan Bayraktar, both of whose own sons were also involved in the scandal.

See also
 List of Governors of Istanbul

References

External links

 Biography at Istanbul Portal 

1949 births
Living people
People from Mardin
Ankara University Faculty of Law alumni
Turkish civil servants
Governors of Istanbul
Justice and Development Party (Turkey) politicians
Ministers of the Interior of Turkey
Deputies of Mardin
Members of the 24th Parliament of Turkey